The 2010 24 Hours of Nürburgring was an endurance sports car race held at the Nürburgring Nordschleife race track in Germany on May 13–16.

The event saw a return of most prominent entries, except the Ford GT, as team Raeder had discontinued this project. To give teams time to rest or for repairs before the race, the night practice was scheduled on Thursday evening. In cold and wet conditions, the Farnbacher-entered Ferrari F430 GTC set the best lap time before the session was red-flagged due to fog. In Friday afternoon qualifying, held in fair weather, it crashed out and was barely repaired in time for the race. With lap times around 8:29, three of Porsche's new SP9/GT3-class cars occupied places 5 to 7, two of them entered by four-time winner Team Manthey, which had chosen to let the #1 car do only a single lap. BMW had entered two of their ALMS BMW M3 GT2, run by Schnitzer Motorsport. Due to the modifications that include a transaxle gear box, they do not comply to the standard rules set of SP classes and their "Balance of Performance". Along with a factory-entered Porsche GT3 Hybrid, the GT2-BMWs have thus been grouped into the E1-XP class for experimental factory entries. The better BMW and the Hybrid posted times of 8:32 and 8:34 in qualifying. Save for the 16th placed GT3-class Dodge Viper, only several other Porsche, Audi R8 and V8-powered BMW Z4 GT3 have qualified in the top 20, with times up to 8:47, which earns them a blue flash light that is supposed to facilitate passing of the approx. 180 slower cars.

Porsche test driver Walter Röhrl had intended to enter on a standard road legal Porsche 911 GT3 RS, but had to withdraw due to health reasons from the team that comprises racers Roland Asch and Patrick Simon, plus journalists Horst von Saurma and Chris Harris. The car, entered in cooperation with sport auto (Germany), is registered as S-GO 2400, and was driven from Weissach to Nürburg. It has qualified with 9:15, 42nd overall, and 9th among the 17 SP7 class entrants, only beaten by its race-prepped Porsche 997 siblings.

The race was started on Saturday 3 p.m. in sunny but cold weather. Already on the Grand Prix track, the #1 Manthey Porsche driven by five-time winner Marcel Tiemann passed all Audis, taking the lead and pulling away about  before catching up in lap 2 with the slowest cars of the third group, which were still in their first lap. After lap 3, three Porsche lead ahead of three Audi, a BMW M3 and the Hybrid-Porsche, which due to his larger range could take the lead after the others pitted. The #1 Manthey Porsche led by a couple of minutes until got involved in a collision after seven hours. At halftime, the race is on pace to another distance record, with the Audi #99 leading by a small margin ahead of the Hybrid Porsche, the only remaining representative of his brand in the top 8, which used to be dominated by Porsche in recent years. Places three to eight were occupied by three Audi R8, two BMW, and, rather surprisingly, on p 5 the Ferrari which had started in row 21. The Porsches that occupy most places up to 15th were followed by the CNG-powered Volkswagen Scirocco GT24, the road-legal Porsche GT3 RS and a Nissan Z33. On Sunday morning, the #99 Audi needed a rear axle change, and with less than 5 hours to go, also the second place #2 Audi failed. This left the Hybrid Porsche in a one lap lead ahead of the #25 BMW GT2 with gearbox woes and the Ferrari, until also the Porsche stopped with less than two hours to go. The BMW made it to the finish, giving Pedro Lamy a record-tying fifth win ahead of Ferrari and Audi. The best Porsche, entered by Alzen, finished only sixth, six laps ahead of the Falken Nissan and the road legal GT3.

The SP4 class was won by 4 Argentinian drivers in the BMW 325i E92 Coupe of Motorsport Team Sorg Rennsport. This was the first victory for an Argentinian team at the 24 hours Nürburgring race and the first Argentinian team to compete in the Nürburgring since Juan Manuel Fangio.

References 

Nurburgring
Nürburgring 24 Hours
May 2010 sports events in Germany